Dzhokhar Dudayev (1944–1996) was the first president of a declared independent Chechnya, now a part of Russia.

Dudayev may also refer to:

People
 Alan Dudayev, Russian world champion in men's freestyle wrestling, 2005
 Aslambek Dudayev, Russian businessman and politician
 Dik Dudyaev, former manager of FC Akhmat Grozny
 Inal Dudayev, Russian soccer player on FC Alania-2 Vladikavkaz

 Yury Dudayev, Russian soccer player on PFC Dynamo Stavropol

Fictional characters
 Amira Dudayev, a character from 24: Legacy
 Ansore Dudayev, a character from Jack Ryan (TV series)

 Sergei Viktor "Serg" Dudayev, a character from Flight of the Endeavour; see List of fictional astronauts (modern period, works released 2000–2009)

Other uses
 Dzhokhar Dudayev Battalion, part of the Free Chechen Army; also participating as part of the Ukrainian Foreign Legion in the 2022 Ukraine-Russia War
 Dudayev Park, Darıca, Kocaeli, Marmara, Turkiye

See also